Kalleh may refer to:
Kalleh, Isfahan, Iran
Kalleh-ye Yari, Khuzestan Province, Iran
Kalleh, Lorestan, Iran
Kalleh, Markazi, Iran
Kalleh Bast, city in Mazandaran Province, Iran
Kaleh Mazandaran VC, former Iranian volleyball club
 Kalleh Dairy, an Iranian dairy, food and drink company

See also
 Kaleh (disambiguation)